The 2021–22 North Dakota State Bison women's basketball team represented North Dakota State University in the 2021–22 NCAA Division I women's basketball season. The Bison, led by third-year head coach Jory Collins, played their home games at the Scheels Center in Fargo, North Dakota, as members of the Summit League.
NDSU made the Summit League Tournament as the number 6 seed. They were defeated in the first round by Kansas City.

Previous season
The Bison finished the 2020-21 season 15–9, 9–7 in Summit League play to finish in third place. In the Summit League Tournament, they defeated Denver in the quarterfinals, but lost to South Dakota in the semifinals.
It was their best season finish since entering Division I in 2009.

Roster

Schedule and results

|-
!colspan=12 style=| Non-conference regular season

|-
!colspan=9 style=| Summit League regular season

|-
!colspan=12 style=| Summit League Tournament

Sources

References

North Dakota State
North Dakota State Bison women's basketball seasons
North Dakota State Bison women's basketball
North Dakota State Bison women's basketball